

References

External links 
IMDB listing for German films made in 1919
filmportal.de listing for films made in 1919

German
Lists of German films
film